is a passenger railway station located in the city of Kōnan, Kōchi Prefecture, Japan. It is operated by the third-sector Tosa Kuroshio Railway with the station number "GN33".

Lines
All Asa Line trains, both rapid and local, stop at the station.

Layout
The station consists of an island platform serving two elevated tracks. There is no station building only a shelter on the platform for waiting passengers. Benches are also provided on a paved area under the elevated structure as a form of waiting area. Access to the platform is by a flight of steps or an elevator. A designated parking area for bicycles is provided underneath the elevated structure.

Adjacent stations

Station mascot
Each station on the Asa Line features a cartoon mascot character designed by Takashi Yanase, a local cartoonist from Kōchi Prefecture. The mascot for Yasu Station is a mermaid named . The design is chosen to recall the "Miss Mermaid Contest" which is held annually at a marine festival at Yasu.

History

Passenger statistics
In fiscal 2011, the station was used by an average of 234 passengers daily.

Surrounding area
Konan City Yasu Government Building (former Yasu Town Hall)
Japan National Route 55

See also 
List of railway stations in Japan

References

External links

Railway stations in Kōchi Prefecture
Railway stations in Japan opened in 2002
Kōnan, Kōchi